Dr. A. E. Muthunayagam (born on 11 January 1939) is a leading space scientist in the Indian Space Research Organisation and the chief architect of rocket propulsion in India. He was responsible for the creation of Liquid Propulsion Systems Centre. For his significant contributions to the development of Propulsion Technology in India, he is known as the father of propulsion technology in India's space program. He chose to return to India from the National Aeronautics and Space Administration for the development of propulsion technology in the Indian Space Research Organisation. He established the Test Stands and Assembly and Integration Facilities in Liquid Propulsion Systems Centre, Mahendragiri for testing liquid stages of the Polar Satellite Launch Vehicle and the Geosynchronous Satellite Launch Vehicle. He is the founder director of Liquid Propulsion Systems Centre] and held the position from 30 November 1985 to 14 April 1994. He held the secretary position in the Department of Ocean Development. He worked as an executive vice-president in Kerala State Council for Science Technology and Environment. He worked as Chairman of the Board of Governors of the Indian Institute of Technology, Chennai from 2005 to 2008. He was appointed under Section 11 of the IIT Act of 1961, which lays down the composition of the Board of Governors for each of the seven Indian Institutes of Technology across India

Education
He obtained his bachelor of engineering (mechanical) degree from the University of Madras in 1960 with first class honors. His master's degree was completed at Indian Institute of Science, Bangalore in 1962 with distinction. He obtained his Doctorate from the school of Mechanical Engineering in Purdue University, USA in 1965. He also completed his law degree in the University of Kerala in 1975.

Career in the Indian Space Research Organisation 
Head, Propulsion Engineering Division, SSTC
Head, Mechanical Engineering Division, SSTC
Project Leader
Rohini 125 Rocket Project
Rohini Multi-stage Rocket Project
Strip Wound Motor Project
Project Engineer and Chairman, Board of Administration, Static Test & Evaluation Complex at Sriharikotta, Andhra Pradesh
Member of Board of Management, Sriharikotta centre
Director, Propulsion Group, VSSC
Project Manager of Vikas Project (Technology Collaboration with French Aeronautical Company)
Chairman, Rocket Propulsion Board
Convener, the Indian Space Research Organisation-Centre national d'études spatiales (France) Launcher Working Group
Adviser, Static Test Facilities of the Indian Space Research Organisation
Programme Director, Auxiliary Propulsion Systems Unit of the Indian Space Research Organisation
Director, Liquid Propulsion Projects
Chairman, LPP Management Board
Chairman, SRC on SLV-3 Rocket Motors
Chairman, Mission Readiness Review, ASLV D1 & D2 Launch

Other official positions
He was a member of Science and Technology Committee constituted by the Government of Kerala, Review Committee for Birla Institute of Technology, Ranchi (Constituted by the Ministry of Social welfare, Government of India) and Scientific Advisory committee on propulsion, National Aeronautical Lab, Bangalore.

International and intergovernmental organizations
Chairman of Regional Committee of Inter-governmental Oceanographic Commission for the Central Indian Ocean (1996–2001)
Chairman, Commission for the Conservation of Antarctic Marine Living Resources (1998–2000)
Vice chairman of Intergovernmental Oceanographic Commission for two years (1996–1998)

Academic contributions
He was coordinator for establishing ancillary Industrial units around the Space Centre in 1970, referee to review papers for International Journal of Heat and Mass Transfer, Pergamon Press, New York City and examiner of post-graduate degree in mechanical engineering, for Kerala University, California University, Birla Institute of Technology, and the Indian Institute of Technology in Madras.

Professional societies
Fellow, Astronautical Society of India
Fellow, Aeronautical Society of India
Fellow, Indian National Academy of Engineering
Foreign Member of Academy of Cosmonautics, Moscow, Russia
Fellow, Institution of Engineers (India)

References

People from Nagercoil
Indian space scientists
Scientists from Tamil Nadu
1939 births
Living people
Indian Space Research Organisation people
Indian Institute of Science alumni
20th-century Indian engineers